Village is a historical-themed euro-style board game with focus on resource management for 2-4 players, released in 2011. It is designed by Inka Brand and Markus Brand.

The game won the 2012 Deutscher Spiele Preis and Kennerspiel des Jahres awards.

References

External links 
 

Board games introduced in 2011
Board games about history
Deutscher Spiele Preis winners
Worker placement board games
Kennerspiel des Jahres winners